Fatato is an uninhabited islet (motu) of Funafuti, Tuvalu. In 2002 the Asia-Pacific Network for Global Change Research (APN) chose this island for a systematic study of its coast in relation to the impact of global climate change on atolls. The islet can be accessed by foot with a 20-30 minute walk from Fongafale across the reef at low tide.

See also

 Desert island
 List of islands

References

External links
  Asian Pacific Network

Uninhabited islands of Tuvalu
Pacific islands claimed under the Guano Islands Act
Funafuti